The 2023 North Carolina Tar Heels football team will represent the University of North Carolina at Chapel Hill as a member of the Atlantic Coast Conference (ACC) in the 2023 NCAA Division I FBS football season. The Tar Heels will be led by head coach Mack Brown, who is in the fifth season of his second stint at North Carolina and 15th overall season at the university. The team will play their home games at Kenan Memorial Stadium.

Previous season
The 2022 Tar Heels football team started the season unranked, but behind the stellar play of quarterback Drake Maye, climbed to as high as No. 13 in the CFP ranking after winning 9 of their first 10 games. The Tar Heels clinched the ACC Coastal Division title and an appearance in the ACC Championship Game with 2 games to play in the regular season. However, after clinching the division, the Heels would lose their remaining four games, including the ACC Championship game against Clemson and the Holiday Bowl against Oregon to finish the season 9–5.

Offseason

Coaching changes
After the ACC Championship Game, offensive coordinator/quarterbacks coach Phil Longo accepted the same position at Wisconsin. Offensive line coach Jack Bicknell Jr. followed Longo to Madison after one year in Chapel Hill.

On December 14, 2022, the Tar Heels hired Randy Clements as the new offensive line coach, and would also hire Chip Lindsey to fill the offensive coordinator/quarterbacks coach vacancy. Along with the new hires, AHC/WR coach Lonnie Galloway added the title of Pass Game Coordinator, and TE coach John Lilly added the title of Run Game Coordinator.

Cornerbacks coach and Tar Heel football legend Dré Bly would leave the program in January, and would be replaced in the position by Indiana safeties coach Jason Jones.

On February 23, 2023, TE coach and run game coordinator John Lilly left for new head coach Frank Reich's staff on the Carolina Panthers. He was replaced four days later by former Cleveland Browns head coach Freddie Kitchens.Kitchens was introduced officially on March 1, in the team's pre-spring practice press conference.

Former Tar Heel letterman and longtime NFL assistant coach Clyde Christensen officially joined the staff as a volunteer offensive analyst as well, after several seasons as the quarterbacks coach for the Tampa Bay Buccaneers.

The defensive staff was fortified also, as former NFL assistant coach Ted Monachino was hired as a defensive analyst.

Departures

Transfers
Per NCAA guidance, players can enter the transfer portal in one of two windows. The first, a 45-day period following the conclusion of the sport's regular season, opened for football in December 2022 and closed in January 2023. A second, shorter transfer period will open in May, following the conclusion of spring practices and the academic semester.

Winter Portal Entries
Source:

Additions

Incoming Transfers
Source:

Personnel

Coaching Staff

Roster

Schedule
The 2023 ACC conference football schedule was released on January 30, 2023. The 2023 season will be the conference's first season under a new single-division format. The 3-5-5 model gives each team three set conference opponents to play every season, while playing the remaining ten teams twice (once at home and once on the road) in a four–year cycle. The Tar Heels' non-rotating opponents are all traditional rivalries: Duke, NC State, and Virginia.

Notes
 Warren and Thigpen have the title of co-defensive coordinator, but serve under Chizik, whose official title is Assistant Head Coach for Defense.

References

North Carolina
North Carolina Tar Heels football seasons
North Carolina Tar Heels football